Thurman Munson Memorial Stadium is a stadium in Canton, Ohio, USA, primarily used for baseball. The facility is named after former Major League Baseball player Thurman Munson, who grew up in Canton. Munson was a New York Yankees catcher who was killed when his private plane was attempting to land at Akron-Canton Regional Airport in Summit County on August 2, 1979. Munson's number 15 is displayed on the center field wall.

It is constructed almost entirely of aluminum.

When they moved out, the ballpark became the home of the Canton Crocodiles, a team of the independent Frontier League, through . In , the Crocodiles left the stadium and it became the home ballpark of the Canton Coyotes, also of the Frontier League. After one season in Canton, the Coyotes moved to Columbia, Missouri and changed its name to the Mid-Missouri Mavericks.

The stadium currently serves as home for the Ohio Men's Senior Baseball League and also hosts high school games and tournaments throughout the season. The stadium is currently leased and managed by the Ohio Men's Senior Baseball League, an amateur adult baseball league whose offices are housed in the stadium.

Since the Canton McKinley boys baseball team moved from Don Scott Field to Thurman Munson Stadium Canton City Schools have done significant upgrades and signed a 25 year lease with the city of Canton

See also
 Canal Park (Akron, Ohio)

Notes

External links
 Stadium web site
 ballparkreviews.com Stadium profile at ballparkreviews.com
 minorleagueballparks.com Stadium profile at minorleagueballparks.com

 

Minor league baseball venues
Sports in Canton, Ohio
Baseball venues in Ohio
Canton-Akron Indians
Buildings and structures in Canton, Ohio
1989 establishments in Ohio
Sports venues completed in 1989
College baseball venues in the United States